Cadena Melodía is a Colombian radio network, founded in 1971 by Liberal politician Efraín Páez Espitia, who owned Radio Melodía of Bogotá since 1959.

Stations 
Melodía Estéreo: AM station in Bogotá, devoted to easy listening music. Until July 2012, when Cadena Melodía leased it to Caracol TV (Bluradio), it was located in the FM band.
Radio Líder: AM stations devoted to news and general programming (the Bogotá station is defunct since July 2012)
Bogotá Estéreo (defunct): tropical music. In the 1980s was sold to an evangelical group, which later would make an exchange agreement with RCN Radio. Under RCN, it would become a bolero station, and then youth-oriented station La Mega.

References

External links 
Cadena Melodía

Radio stations established in 1971
Radio stations in Colombia